Rok plc was a British construction company, based in Exeter. Rok went into administration in 2010.

History

The company, which began as Exeter Building Contractors Ltd, was formed in 1939 to take on government contracts at the start of the Second World War. This company became EBC Group, and was relaunched as Rok in 2001, with the slogan The Nation's Local Builder.

Rok's largest acquisition was in 2006, when they bought Inverness-based Tulloch Construction for £31.3 million, with Tulloch's 875 staff transferred to Rok. This included The Corrie Group, Tulloch's engineering, plumbing and electrical division.

Rok went into administration in November 2010, after reporting a £3.8 million loss for the first half of the year.

Rok's affordable housing and construction businesses were bought by Balfour Beatty for £7 million. Balfour Beatty said the businesses and 381 employees would become part of Mansell, its regional construction business.

References

External links

Defunct construction and civil engineering companies
Construction and civil engineering companies of the United Kingdom
Companies based in Exeter
British companies disestablished in 2010
1939 establishments in England
2010 disestablishments in England
British companies established in 1939
Technology companies established in 1939
Technology companies disestablished in 2010
Construction and civil engineering companies established in 1939
Construction and civil engineering companies disestablished in 2010